The 1987 Minnesota Golden Gophers football team represented the University of Minnesota in the 1987 NCAA Division I-A football season. In their second year under head coach John Gutekunst, the Golden Gophers compiled a 6–5 record and were outscored by their opponents by a combined total of 262 to 257.

Offensive guard Troy Wilkow was named All-Big Ten first team.  Offensive lineman Paul Anderson, quarterback Rickey Foggie, tailback Darrell Thompson, kicker Chip Lohmiller and linebacker Jon Leverenz were named All-Big Ten second team.  Punter Brent Herbel and offensive lineman Dan Liimatta were named Academic All-Big Ten.

Foggie was awarded the Bronko Nagurski Award.  Darrell Thompson was awarded the Bruce Smith Award.  Jon Leverenz was awarded the Carl Eller Award.  Chip Lohmiller was awarded the Bobby Bell Award.  Linebacker Brian Bonner was awarded the Butch Nash Award.  Offensive tackle Dan Rechtin was awarded the Paul Giel Award.

Total attendance for the season was 371,809, which averaged out to 55,116 per game. The season high for attendance was against rival Wisconsin.

Schedule

Roster
QB Rickey Foggie
K Chip Lohmiller, Sr.

References

Minnesota
Minnesota Golden Gophers football seasons
Minnesota Golden Gophers football